The France women's national squash team represents France in international squash team competitions, and is governed by the French Squash Federation.

Since 1987, France has participated in five quarter finals of the World Squash Team Open.

Current team
 Camille Serme
 Coline Aumard
 Mélissa Alves
 Énora Villard

Results

World Team Squash Championships

See also 
 French Squash Federation
 World Team Squash Championships
 France men's national squash team

References

External links 
 Team France

Squash teams
Women's national squash teams
Squash in France
Women's national sports teams of France